This is a list of former sports teams from the US state of Ohio:

Baseball

Major League Baseball
Cincinnati Red Stockings were the first professional baseball club founded in 1866 and disbanded following the 1870 season. During the offseason, core members such as brothers Harry & George Wright moved to Boston to help start a newly formed baseball club called the Boston Red Stockings, eventually becoming known as the Boston Braves; the team moved to Milwaukee and became the Milwaukee Braves, and finally moved to Atlanta and are now the Atlanta Braves.
Cleveland Spiders

Frontier League
Ohio Valley Redcoats (2005 split season between Marietta, Lorain and Lafayette, Indiana. Original Ohio Valley team from 1993 to 1998 was based in Parkersburg, West Virginia) 
Canton Crocodiles (1997–2001, sold to group from Washington, Pennsylvania and are now the Washington Wild Things) 
Canton Coyotes (2002) 
 Newark Buffalos/Bison (1994–1995) 
 Chillicothe Paints (1994–2008, team name is used as wood-bat league collegiate team) 
 Portsmouth Explorers (1993–1995) 
 Zanesville Greys (1993–1996, moved to Canton for 1997 season) 
 Lancaster Scouts (1993–1995)

Negro National League
Cincinnati Cubans
Cleveland Browns
Cleveland Cubs/Columbus Elite Giants (would move to Washington, D.C. and become the Washington Elite Giants, and later move to Baltimore and become the Baltimore Elite Giants for the rest of the team's existence)
Cleveland Elites
Cleveland Hornets
Cleveland Tate Stars
Columbus Buckeyes
Dayton Marcos
Toledo Tigers

Negro National League (1933–1948)
Cleveland Red Sox

National Colored Base Ball League
Cincinnati Browns

Negro American League
Cincinnati Buckeyes/Cleveland Buckeyes (would move to Louisville, Kentucky and become the Louisville Buckeyes for the rest of the team's existence)
Cincinnati Clowns (would move to Indianapolis, Indiana and become the Indianapolis Clowns for the rest of the team's existence)
Cincinnati Tigers

American Association (20th Century)
Columbus Senators/Columbus Red Birds (moved to Omaha, Nebraska and became the Omaha Cardinals for the rest of the team's existence)
Toledo Mud Hens (first) (moved to Wichita, Kansas and became the Wichita Braves, would move again to Fort Worth, Texas and become the Fort Worth Cats, and move again to Dallas, Texas and become the Dallas Rangers for the rest of the team's existence)
Toledo Mud Hens (second) (moved to Charleston, West Virginia and became the Charleston Senators for the rest of the team's existence)

American Association
Cincinnati Kelly's Killers
Columbus Buckeyes (AA)
Columbus Solons
Toledo Blue Stockings
Toledo Maumees

Union Association
Cincinnati Outlaw Reds

Players' League
Cleveland Infants

National Association of Professional Base Ball Players
Cleveland Forest Citys

International Association
Columbus Buckeyes (minor league)

Basketball

National Basketball Association
Cincinnati Royals (moved to Kansas City, Missouri and became the Kansas City Kings, would move again to Sacramento, California and are now the Sacramento Kings)
Cleveland Rebels

World Basketball League
Youngstown Pride (1987–1992) (ceased operations when the WBL folded in 1992)

International Basketball Association
Youngstown Hawks (1999–2000) (franchise was moved to Saskatoon, Saskatchewan, Canada during the 1999–2000 campaign)

American Basketball League
Columbus Quest  (1996–1998)

Continental Basketball Association
Columbus Horizon  (1991–1994)

International Basketball League
Akron Lightning

International Basketball League (1998–2001)
Cincinnati Stuff

National Basketball League
Akron Firestone Non-Skids
Akron Wingfoots
Cincinnati Comellos
Cleveland Brassmen
Cleveland Transfers
Cleveland White Horses
Columbus Athletic Supply
Dayton Metropolitans
Dayton Rens
Toledo Chevrolets
Toledo Jeeps

American Basketball League
Cleveland Rosenblums
Toledo Red Men

American Basketball League (1961–1963)
Cleveland Pipers

Women's National Basketball Association
Cleveland Rockers

Women's Professional Basketball League
Dayton Rockettes

American Basketball League
Columbus Quest

Football

National Football League
Cleveland Rams (moved to Los Angeles and became the Los Angeles Rams, moved to St. Louis and became the St. Louis Rams before returning to Los Angeles and once again becoming the Los Angeles Rams)
Portsmouth Spartans (moved to Detroit in 1934 and became the Detroit Lions)
Akron Pros (defunct)
Canton Bulldogs/Cleveland Bulldogs/Cleveland Indians (NFL) (defunct)
Cincinnati Reds (NFL) (defunct)
Cleveland Tigers/Cleveland Indians (NFL) (defunct)
Cincinnati Celts (defunct)
Columbus (NFL) (Panhandles/Tigers) (defunct)
Dayton Triangles (defunct)
Oorang Indians (defunct)
Toledo Maroons (moved to Kenosha, Wisconsin and became the Kenosha Maroons for the rest of the team's existence)

Arena Football League
Cincinnati Rockers (1992–1993)
Columbus Destroyers (2004–2008)
Columbus Thunderbolts (1991)
Cleveland Thunderbolts (1992–1994)
Cleveland Gladiators (2008-2019

National Indoor Football League
Dayton Warbirds

Continental Football League
Akron Vulcans

Continental Indoor Football League
Steubenville Stampede (2005–2007)
Summit County Rumble (2006–2007)

Eastern Indoor Football League
Mahoning Valley HitMen
Northeast Ohio Panthers

Pre-NFL Teams
Elyria Athletics
Ironton Tanks
Massillon Tigers
Shelby Blues
Youngstown Patricians

World League of American Football
Ohio Glory

Hockey

National Hockey League
Cleveland Barons (NHL) (merged with the Minnesota North Stars and later moved to Dallas to become the Dallas Stars)

All-American Hockey League
Dayton Jets (1985–87), (formed from the Findlay Warriors, eventually merged to form the Miami Valley Sabres in 1987)
Miami Valley Sabres (1987–89), (ceased operations after the league folded in the summer of 1989)
Troy Sabres (1982–87), (merged with the Dayton Jets to form the Miami Valley Sabres in 1987)

American Hockey League
Cleveland Barons (1937–73) (moved to Jacksonville, Florida and become the Jacksonville Barons for the rest of the team's existence)
Cleveland Barons (2001–06) (moved to Worcester, Massachusetts to become the Worcester Sharks before moving to San Jose, California where they are now the San Jose Barracuda)

Central Hockey League
Youngstown SteelHounds

ECHL
Cincinnati Cyclones (previously a member of the IHL)
Columbus Chill (moved to Reading, Pennsylvania and are now the Reading Royals)
Toledo Storm (defunct)
Dayton Bombers

International Hockey League
Akron Americans (defunct)
Dayton Gems (original) (merged with the Milwaukee Admirals, now in the American Hockey League)
Cleveland Falcons/Indians (transferred to the American Hockey League and became the Cleveland Barons (1937–73); eventually moved to Jacksonville, Florida and became the Jacksonville Barons for the rest of the team's existence)
Cleveland Lumberjacks (1992–2001) (formerly the Muskegon Lumberjacks (1984–92); franchise ceased operations when the IHL folded in 2001)
Dayton Gems (2009–2012) (second) (defunct)
Cincinnati Cyclones (went defunct, moved to the ECHL)
Cincinnati Mohawks (defunct)
Dayton Owls (moved to Grand Rapids, Michigan and became the Grand Rapids Owls for the rest of the team's existence)
Columbus Owls (defunct)
Marion Barons (defunct)
Toledo Blades/Toledo Hornets/Toledo Goaldiggers (defunct)
Toledo Mercurys (defunct)
Troy Bruins (defunct)

United Hockey League/Colonial Hockey League
Columbus Stars (defunct)
Dayton Ice Bandits (defunct)
Ohio Gears/Arctic Xpress of Massillon/Canton Ice Patrol. (defunct)

World Hockey Association
Cincinnati Stingers (defunct)
Cleveland Crusaders (moved to Saint Paul, Minnesota and became the Minnesota Fighting Saints for the rest of the team's existence)
Dayton Arrows (moved to Houston, Texas and became the Houston Aeros for the rest of the team's existence)

North Eastern Hockey League
Findlay Freedom (defunct)

Continental Elite Hockey League
Daytona Gems (defunct)
Toledo Ice Diggers (defunct)
Toledo Wolf Pack (defunct)

International Independent Hockey League
Ohio Valley Ice Cats (defunct)

Federal Hockey League
 Mentor Ice Breakers

Soccer

Major Indoor Soccer League
Cincinnati Kids
Cleveland Crunch
Cleveland Force

United States Interregional Soccer League
Cincinnati Cheetahs
Ohio Xoggz / Columbus Xoggz
Toledo Twisters

USL League Two
Known as the Premier Development League before 2019
Columbus Shooting Stars

American Soccer League
Cincinnati Comets
Cleveland Stars/Cleveland Cobras
Columbus Magic

North American Soccer League
Cleveland Stokers

National Professional Soccer League
Canton Invaders / Columbus Invaders
Cincinnati Silverbacks
Columbus Capitals
Dayton Dynamo
Toledo Pride

Softball

Men's Professional Softball Leagues
Cincinnati Rivermen
Cincinnati Suds
Cleveland Competitors
Cleveland Jaybirds
Columbus All-Americans

National Pro Fastpitch
Akron Racers

Tennis

World TeamTennis
Cleveland Nets (moved to New Orleans, Louisiana and became the New Orleans Nets for the rest of the team's existence)

Ultimate Disc

American Ultimate Disc League
Columbus Cranes (2012)

See also
List of defunct Florida sports teams
List of defunct Georgia sports teams
List of defunct Idaho sports teams
List of defunct Mississippi sports teams
List of defunct Pennsylvania sports teams
List of defunct Texas sports teams

References

Ohio

Defunct teams